Jennifer Chambers Lynch (born April 7, 1968) is an American filmmaker. The daughter of filmmaker David Lynch, she made her directorial debut with the film Boxing Helena in 1993. Following a troubled production, the film was a critical and commercial failure, with Lynch receiving a Golden Raspberry Award for Worst Director. The negative reception to her feature debut and controversy surrounding its release led to Lynch taking a 15-year hiatus from filmmaking.

Lynch returned to directing with 2008's Surveillance. The film received mixed reviews, although it won the top prize at the Sitges Film Festival. A year later, Lynch began work on her next film Hisss, which she disowned after the production was completed without her involvement. Her fourth film Chained, released in 2012, was met with a positive critical reception. Since 2012, Lynch has focused on directing episodes of television series, including Psych, Teen Wolf, The Walking Dead, American Horror Story, Once Upon a Time, Hawaii Five-0, Elementary, The Strain, Agents of S.H.I.E.L.D., 9-1-1, and Ratched.

Outside of her career as a director, Lynch wrote the book The Secret Diary of Laura Palmer in 1990. Told from the perspective of the character of the same name from her father's television series Twin Peaks, the novel was a commercial success, reaching number four on The New York Times paperback fiction best seller list that year.

Early life
Lynch was born in Philadelphia. She is the daughter of artist and filmmaker David Lynch, who is responsible for her Finnish ancestry, and painter Peggy Reavey (née Margaret Vosburgh Lentz). She began practicing Transcendental Meditation at the age of six. Lynch graduated from the Interlochen Art Academy where she studied visual arts and creative writing.

Career

Film
Lynch was educated in Los Angeles and Michigan at Interlochen Arts Academy. Together with her mother, Lynch made a brief appearance in her father's debut feature film Eraserhead, but her appearance was not included in the final cut. Lynch subsequently worked as a production assistant on Blue Velvet (1986), also directed by her father.

Boxing Helena (1993)
Lynch's commissioned screenplay for Boxing Helena, which she would later go on to direct, attracted many actresses, including Madonna. Sherilyn Fenn, one of the stars of both her father's television series Twin Peaks and his film Wild at Heart, was ultimately cast as leading character Helena. Kim Basinger was also attached and was famously sued after resigning from the project. The controversy surrounding that case, as well as feminist outcry over Helena'''s sadistic subject matter  and accusations of nepotism, accompanied the movie's critical drubbing upon its release in 1993.

In a 2009 interview with The Hollywood Interview, Lynch mentions her reactions to the critical reception of Boxing Helena:

I would love to know why people were so mad at me for telling a crazy fairy tale. I'm the first to say I didn't know what I was doing. I did the best I could at 19, and all these crazy things happened. The idea that the film was faulted when everyone involved worked so fucking hard and believed in me, and there were these adults believing in me, who was essentially a child…when the National Organization of Women slammed me, that was sort of the final straw. It was no wonder I put my legs behind my ears and got pregnant. (laughs) Not that I didn't love sex before then, but seriously. It was my child, essentially, who saved my life.

Surveillance (2008)
Following a lengthy hiatus, Lynch directed Surveillance , which won the top prize at the Festival de Cine de Sitges. A month later, Lynch became the first woman to receive the New York City Horror Film Festival's Best Director award.

 Hisss (2009) 
Lynch was announced as director of the film Nagin (the film is also known as Hisss) that featured Bollywood actress Mallika Sherawat, but the film that was released was not Lynch's work, even though the producers attached her name to the final product. Lynch explained in a 2012 interview:

"Well, ultimately, I didn't get to make that film. I put my director's cut together, and the producers decided it was not what they wanted.  They took it back to India. I never did any scoring or cutting or color-timing or any of the things you do to make the movie. They took the footage and changed it into what they wanted it to be. So it's not my film. I went to India and shot some footage, but I have nothing to do with the movie they made."

 Chained (2012) 
Lynch then directed and co-wrote the 2012 thriller film Chained, in which Vincent D'Onofrio stars as a cab-driving serial killer. It received mostly positive reviews from critics, with a 68% rating on review aggregator website, Rotten Tomatoes.

 Future film projects 
Lynch was scheduled to film Visibility for the Motion Picture Corporation of America in 2011, but, as of August 2021, this project is not completed.

, Lynch was preparing A Fall from Grace, a film set and filmed in St. Louis and inspired by the Old Chain of Rocks Bridge.

Television
Lynch has directed episodes of many television series such as Dahmer – Monster: The Jeffrey Dahmer Story, The Watcher, Jessica Jones, Finding Carter, Psych, Quantico, Teen Wolf, The Walking Dead, The Last Ship, Wayward Pines, American Horror Story, The Strain, Once Upon a Time,  Hawaii Five-0 and Agents of S.H.I.E.L.D.Other projects
Lynch authored The Secret Diary of Laura Palmer to accompany the television show Twin Peaks which was created by her father David Lynch and Mark Frost.

In 1993, Lynch directed the music video "Living in the Rose" by the British rock band New Model Army.

On March 21, 2010, Lynch was a judge at the International Surrealist Film Festival and she worked as producer for the Corey Brandenstein natural horror film The Compound.

An Australian documentary titled Despite the Gods, which chronicles Lynch's struggle to make the film Hisss, was released in 2012. The documentary was shown at the Canadian International Documentary Festival and the program described the film: "Out of her depth shooting on location with an Indian crew and two top Bollywood stars, Lynch turns her production into a vehicle for her own self-actualization, paying no regard to timeline, budget or reality. As the story in front of the camera derails, the story behind the camera explodes.". She eventually disowned the film.

As of 2015, she is also a member of the board of advisers for the Hollywood Horror Museum.

Awards and nominationsBoxing Helena received incredibly scathing reviews upon its release and a Razzie Award for "Worst Director." Nevertheless, it was nominated for Grand Jury Prize in the Dramatic category at the Sundance Film Festival.

Personal life
Lynch revealed in a 2009 interview that she underwent three spinal surgeries following the release of Boxing Helena'' due to a car accident that occurred when she was 19 years old. In the same interview, Lynch stated that she has a daughter.

Filmography

Film

Television

References

Further reading
 A French article about Jennifer Lynch's works (The Secret Diary of Laura Palmer and Boxing Helena)
 Jennifer Lynch at FEARnet
 Interview with Hisss (2010) director Jennifer Chambers Lynch
 Interview with director of Chained, Jennifer Lynch

External links
 
 Jennifer Lynch at Allmovie

American film producers
American music video directors
English-language film directors
American women film directors
Interlochen Center for the Arts alumni
Living people
American women screenwriters
Film directors from Michigan
American people of Finnish descent
Female music video directors
American television directors
American women television directors
American women film producers
1968 births
David Lynch